The War Merit Cross is an Italian military decoration. It was instituted by King Victor Emmanuel III during World War I on 19 January 1918. The award received major changes during World War II and is issued by the Italian Republic as well.

Eligibility
The Italian War Merit Cross was awarded to members of the armed forces with a minimum of one year's service in contact with an enemy, or who received the Medal of the Wounded, or to those who, when mentioned for war merit, received a promotion. Also, if an act of valour was deemed insufficient for the Medal of Military Valor, the War Merit Cross could be awarded instead; from 1922 onwards a bronze sword on the ribbon showed this class of award.

From its institution until 30 May 1927, 1,034,924 Crosses were issued.

Design

The War Merit Cross was in bronze, 38mm wide (1-1/2 inches). The reverse side bears a 5-pointed star on a background of rays. The obverse has the royal cypher ("VE III" under a crown) in the upper arm, "MERITO DI GVERRA" (War Merit) on the horizontal arms and a Roman sword point upwards, on oak leaves, in the lower arm. The ribbon is blue with white stripes. While the later originally were five within months they were reduced to two white stripes. Successive awards, three awardings being the maximum, were indicated by one or two bronze royal crowns. During World War II, the War Merit Cross underwent a number of significant changes. The number of awardings was limited to ten, indicated by a combination of bronze, silver and gold crowns. The medal received another change under the Italian Republic in 1947, the royal cypher being replaced by the intertwined letters "RI" for Repubblica Italiana. Limited to three awardings once again, with one cross or bar for every war allowed, multiple awards were shown by bronze stars. In the current form multiple awards are shown by silver stars.

Notable recipients

Robert L. Blackwell, Private, US Army, MoH
Tasker H. Bliss, General, US Army
Inigo Campioni. Lieutenant Commander (later Admiral), Italian Navy
Evans Carlson, Brigadier General, US Marines, leader of Carlson's Raiders
Giuseppe Cirrincione, Maresciallo Dell'aeronautica
William Alexander Cunningham, Captain 321st Battalion US Army, Awarded January 19, 1918, n205
William J. Donovan, Major General, US Army, MoH
Gino De Giorgi (twice), Admiral, Italian Navy
Richmond H. Hilton, Sergeant, US Army, MoH
Edouard Izac, Lieutenant, US Navy, MoH, Representative from California
Clayton P. Kerr, United States Army Major General and member of Allied Mission to Italian Army in World War II
Frank Luke, Jr., Second Lieutenant, US Army Air Service, MoH
Douglas MacArthur, General, US Army, MoH
Carioti Quinto, Private, Italian Army
George H. Weems, United States Army Brigadier General, DSC
Alvin York, Sergeant, US Army, MoH

References

Military awards and decorations of Italy